Renibacterium salmoninarum is a member of the Micrococcaceae family. It is a Gram-positive, intracellular bacterium that causes disease in young salmonid fish. The infection is most commonly known as "bacterial kidney disease" but may also be referred to as BKD, White Boil Disease, Dee Disease, Salmonid Kidney Disease and Corynebacterial Kidney Disease. It is of significant ecologic importance due to its effect on both farmed and wild salmonids. The disease is found in North America, Europe, Japan, Chile and Scandinavia, and is spread both vertically and horizontally. Pacific salmon appear to be the most susceptible to the disease.

Clinical signs
The severity of clinical signs is very variable. There may be no outward clinical signs, or fish may show signs of lethargy and anaemia. Haemorrhagic skin lesions and exophthalmos may develop.

On postmortem examination there are normally signs of necrosis and granulomatous inflammation on the internal organs, especially the kidney.

A diagnosis cannot be made based on clinical signs, instead laboratory tests such as specialised bacterial culture, ELISA, PCR and fluorescent antibody testing are necessary to identify the bacteria. Ideally more than one test should be used to confirm diagnosis.

Treatment & control
Oral or injectable antibiotics should be used to treat the infection. Intraperitoneal vaccination can also be used to treat fish in an outbreak.

Prevention is very important, and husbandry measures such as segregation, culling and decontamination should be used to ensure infection is not introduced.

References

External links
Type strain of Renibacterium salmoninarum at BacDive -  the Bacterial Diversity Metadatabase

Bacterial diseases of fish
Bacteria described in 1980
Micrococcaceae